St Dominic's College is an independent Catholic secondary day school for boys, located in Penrith, a suburb in Western Sydney, New South Wales, Australia. St. Dominic's College was established in 1959 by the Congregation of Christian Brothers, who continue to run the school.

Overview
Between 1978 and 1985, years 11 and 12 (the most senior years) at the College were co-educational. With the establishment of McCarthy Catholic College, Emu Plains, however, the College returned to being an all-boys school. Currently, more than 1,100 students from across Greater Western Sydney attend the College.

In 2009 the schools 50th year, the school's captain was Joel Kelly. The DUX that year, who received an ATAR of 99.85 was Peter Fam. In the school's 59th year, Ahmed Khan, the DUX for that year, was announced as receiving an ATAR of 99.5. Year 8 students are now studying two languages: Italian and Japanese.

The school's TAS Department is state-of-the-art, with multiple 3D printers, woodwork and metalwork workshops. The school provides qualified tutors for students.

Notable alumni

 Greg AlexanderAustralian rugby league footballer who played in the 1980s and 1990s, and commentator
 Blake Austinrugby league footballer
 Stuart Ayres MPMember for Penrith
 Zac Cinirugby league footballer
 Nathan Clearyrugby league footballer
 Geoff Danielarugby league footballer
 Kurt Fallsrugby league footballer
 Brad Fittlerrugby league footballer and coach
 Akoldah Gak professional basketball player
 Jordan Grantrugby league footballer
 Des Haslerrugby league footballer and coach
 Michael HartleyAustralian rules footballer
 Michael Jenningsrugby league footballer
 Graham KennedyNew Zealand national rugby league team captain; principal of the college from 1994 to 2002
 Nicolas Milanovic professional footballer who plays for Western United FC in the A-League
 Clay Priestrugby league footballer
 Dominic Purcellactor in Prison Break
 Luke Rooneyrugby league footballer
 Jake SteinAustralian rules footballer
 Tim Sheensrugby league footballer and coach
 Mason Teaguerugby league footballer
 Tai TuivasaUFC star
 Dallin Watene-Zelezniakrugby league footballer
 Malakai Watene Zelezniakrugby league footballer

See also 

 List of Catholic schools in New South Wales
 Catholic education in Australia

Reference list

External links
 

Boys' schools in New South Wales
Congregation of Christian Brothers secondary schools in Australia
Educational institutions established in 1959
Catholic secondary schools in Sydney
Penrith, New South Wales
1959 establishments in Australia